Kaliabor, a sub-division town in Nagaon district of Assam situated at a distance of 48 km east of Nagaon town. It was the headquarters of Borphukans during the Ahom era. Kaliabor lies in the middle of assam and surrounded in the north by the Brahmaputra, in the south by the hills of Karbi Anglong district, in the east by Kaziranga National Park under Golaghat district and in the west by Samaguri under Nagaon Sadar Sub-Division.

Kaliabor – the rice bowl of Assam – Kaliabor occupies an important place in the annals of Assam history. The name "Kaliabor" owes its origin to the word "Tun-Rung-Dam", which means 'A Place of Black Big Trees' in the Tai language (Tun = Black, Run = Big, Dam = Tree).

Kaliabor is famous for its several tourist spots both religious and natural. Distinct religious site includes Bhorali Namghar, Kamakhya Temlple, Hatimura Durga Temple.

Education

School
 Kaliabor College
 Pachim Kaliabor High School
 Khaloiati LP School
 Kuwaritol High School
 Kendriya Vidyalaya Missa Cantt.
 Don Bosco School, Missa
 Holy Faith English School
 Sandipani Vidyamandir
 Missa High school
 St.Roberts School
 Kuwaritol Girls High School
 Kaliabor Higher Secondary School
 Kaliabor Girls Higher Secondary School
 Shankar dev Shishu Niketon,Kaliabor
 Borbhagia High School
 Ambagan High School 
 Banketeswar LP School 
 Sishu Bidyapith High School 
 Bimala Academy 
 Jakhalabandha H S School
 Nav Gurukul
 Hindustani Kendriya Vidyalaya
 Gorubandha LP School
 paschim pubthoria high school

Politics

Kaliabor is part of Kaliabor (Lok Sabha constituency).

References

See also
 Kaliabor (Lok Sabha constituency)

 Kaliabor College
 Missa

Cities and towns in Nagaon district